Silvia Pollicini (born 31 December 1998) is an Italian professional racing cyclist, who currently rides for UCI Women's Continental Team .

References

External links
 

1998 births
Living people
Italian female cyclists
Cyclists from Varese